The Reverend is a 2011 horror film directed by Neil Jones. It had its world premiere on October 7, 2011 at the Grimm Up North Film Festival and received a DVD release on February 11, 2014 through Level 33. The story is a very loose retelling of the Book of Job. The film had a predominantly negative reception.

Plot
An eager and nameless new priest is sent to a small village to serve as their resident priest, but he is unaware that he is the basis of a bet between the Almighty and the Withstander, with his soul as the prize. This bet is put into action when he is turned into a vampire. He then has to find a way to not only battle his craving for blood, but also rid the area of crime and save the life of the prostitute Tracy.

Cast
 Stuart Brennan as The Reverend
 Tamer Hassan as Harold Hicks
 Rutger Hauer as Withstander
 Doug Bradley as Reverend Andrews
 Giovanni Lombardo Radice as Almighty
 Emily Booth as Tracy
 Simon Phillips as Detective
 Marcia Do Vales as Girl
 Shane Richie as Prince
 Mads Koudal as Viking
 Edmund Kingsley as Thug
 Helen Griffin as Mrs. Jenkins
 Dominic Burns as 'Big' Bazza
 Billy Rumbol as Ryan
 Richie Woodhall as Inspector Rodin

Reception
Critical reception for The Reverend has been predominantly negative. Much of the criticism centered around the film's plot, as most reviewers felt that the movie did not live up to its full potential. Twitch Film panned the film and commented that "The Reverend is that rare beast, in other words, a terrible film that thinks it's onto a winner; if you want to see how terrible, then go right ahead, but everyone else should stay well away." Shock Till You Drop also gave a negative review and stated that the film's cast was wasted, as "You can have a star in the film in a two minute scene and have them steal the show. That doesn’t happen here." Starburst gave a mixed review, stating that while the movie was "ultimately scuppered by its lack of focus and the fact that it’s way too ambitious for both its budget and the capabilities of its director" it "isn’t a disaster of biblical proportions and can charitably be filed under ‘interesting failure.'"

References

External links
 
 
 

2011 films
2011 horror films
British vampire films
Films based on the Hebrew Bible
Book of Job
2010s English-language films
Films directed by Neil Jones
2010s British films